= Crenotrichaceae =

Scientific classification
- Domain: Bacteria
- Kingdom: Pseudomonadati
- Phylum: Pseudomonadota
- Class: Gammaproteobacteria
- Order: Methylococcales
- Family: Crenotrichaceae; Hansgirg 1888 (Approved Lists 1980)

Genera
- "Clonothrix" Roze 1896; Crenothrix Cohn 1870 (Approved Lists 1980); Toxothrix Molisch 1925 (Approved Lists 1980)

Family of bacteria

Crenotrichaceae is a family of environmental bacteria.
